Carabus marietti ornatus is a subspecies of brown-coloured ground beetle in the Carabinae subfamily that is endemic to Turkey.

References

marietti ornatus
Beetles described in 1976
Endemic fauna of Turkey